Carlos Braconi (born 23 September 1947) is an Argentine wrestler. He competed in two events at the 1976 Summer Olympics.

References

External links
 

1947 births
Living people
Argentine male sport wrestlers
Olympic wrestlers of Argentina
Wrestlers at the 1976 Summer Olympics
Place of birth missing (living people)
Pan American Games medalists in wrestling
Pan American Games bronze medalists for Argentina
Wrestlers at the 1975 Pan American Games
Medalists at the 1975 Pan American Games
20th-century Argentine people
21st-century Argentine people